Kristian Gregorič (born 20 February 1989 in Šempeter pri Gorici) is a Slovenian track cyclist specialising in the sprint disciplines.

Career

Race results

Personal life

Gregorič was born in Šempeter pri Gorici, present day Slovenia. He competed 10 years on the road races, then in the under-23 category decided to continue the track races (sprint 200 metres and KEIRIN). He is the only Slovenian representative in this discipline with high successful. He is a serious contender for the Olympic Games in Rio 2016.

References

External links 
 
 Results
 http://prijavim.se/profile/view/3472/Gregoric_Kristian

1989 births
Living people
Slovenian male cyclists
Slovenian track cyclists
People from Šempeter pri Gorici